Cao Sheng (born 26 February 1995) is a Chinese footballer who currently plays as a midfielder for  Shandong Luneng.

Club career
Cao Sheng started his professional football career in 2012 when he was sent out to Shandong Youth for the 2012 China League Two. He went to Portugal for further training in January 2014, and played for Sintrense, Real Massamá and União Torreense between 2014 and 2016.

Cao was promoted to Shandong Luneng's first team squad by Felix Magath in June 2017. He made his debut for the club on 21 June 2017, playing the whole match in the 2017 Chinese FA Cup against Tianjin Teda, which Shandong won 1–0. On 9 July 2017, he made his Chinese Super League debut in a 2–0 away win against Tianjin Teda, coming on as a substitute for Jin Jingdao in the 89th minute.

Cao would struggle to gain much more playing time before being dropped to the reserves and then loaned out to third tier club Zibo Cuju on 14 October 2020. He would be loaned out once more to another third tier club in Qingdao Hainiu on 1 July 2021. He would go on to play a vital part as the club won the third tier title and promotion at the end of the 2021 China League Two season. His loan would be extended and he would go on to achieve successive promotions as he helped guide the club to second in the 2022 China League One season and promotion back into the top tier.

Career statistics
.

Honours

Club
Qingdao Hainiu
China League Two: 2021

References

External links
 

1995 births
Living people
Chinese footballers
Footballers from Wuhan
S.C.U. Torreense players
Shandong Taishan F.C. players
Segunda Divisão players
Chinese Super League players
Association football midfielders
Chinese expatriate footballers
Expatriate footballers in Portugal
Chinese expatriate sportspeople in Portugal
S.U. Sintrense players